Donald Nelson Rhodes (July 9, 1909 — January 1, 1968) was a professional American football player for the Pittsburgh Pirates of the National Football League (NFL).  He attended Allentown Prep in Allentown, Pennsylvania.  He attended Washington & Jefferson College.

Notes
 

1909 births
1968 deaths
People from Hollidaysburg, Pennsylvania
Players of American football from Pennsylvania
Washington & Jefferson College alumni
Washington & Jefferson Presidents football players
Pittsburgh Pirates (football) players
Sportspeople from Allentown, Pennsylvania